Monstera kessleri is a flowering plant in genus Monstera of the arum family Araceae.

Distribution 
It is native to Bolivia.

References 

kessleri
Plants described in 2005
Flora of Bolivia